Al-Nakhla is a sub-district located in Al Qafr District, Ibb Governorate, Yemen. Al-Nakhla had a population of  2177 as of 2004.

References 

Sub-districts in Al Qafr District